Women of Uganda Network (WOUGNET) is Ugandan non-governmental organization dedicated to aiding women and women's organizations in the use of information and communication technologies (ICTs) as tools to share information and address issues collectively. WOUGNET is a member of the Association for Progressive Communications (APC) since January 2005, Girls Not Brides since 25 March 2012, The Global Network Initiative (GNI) since 2019 and Digital Human Rights Lab since 2019.

The director was Dorothy Okello. WOUGNET's current executive director from October 2020 to date is Peace Oliver Amuge.

History

WOUGNET was set up in May 2000 by women's organisations from Uganda. Its mailing lists are hosted by Kabissa. WOUGNET's mission is "to promote the use of information and communication technologies by women and girls for gender equality and sustainable development. The aim is to improve the conditions of life for Ugandan women, by enhancing their capacities and opportunities for exchange, collaboration and information sharing. WOUGNET’s vision is an inclusive and just society where women and girls are enabled to use ICTs for sustainable development. WOUGNET activities are conducted under three programme areas: Information Sharing and Networking, Technical Support, and Gender and ICT Policy Advocacy. Through these programs, the organisation  expects to make a significant contribution to the use of ICTs in Uganda that is in line with the national vision of “a knowledge-based Uganda where national development and good governance are sustainably enhanced and accelerated by timely and secure access to information and efficient application of ICT". The organisation works in urban and rural areas throughout Uganda. WOUGNET's offices are located in northern and Eastern Uganda called Kubere Information Centre (KIC Apac) and Tororo Information Centre. KIC Apac was established in 2005 with support from Centre for Technical Assistance of Netherlands plan with the aim of  having a multi-dimensional information center offering development-oriented information, with an emphasis on agricultural and rural development information.

WOUGNET is a member of  ICT4Democracy (ICT4D) network and Women's Rights Online (WRO) network spearheaded by World Wide Web Foundation.

Tools

Primarily, WOUGNET focuses on using mobile phones, email and the web, and is interested in the integration of "traditional means" such as radio, video, and print in a way that it enables wider outreach. Additionally, the organisation uses tools such as Television, Email, social media and Print with the internet as an enabler to communicate and share information. Subscriptions to the WOUGNET's mailing lists, drawn from a global audience, have grown from 50 in the year 2000 to 1,292 (spread out across two lists, the WOUGNET mailing list and the WOUGNET update newsletter) by December 2006.  WOUGNET's interventions are: (1) providing information at varying digital platforms that enables productivity, (2) easing access, utilization and application of ICTs, and (3) influencing the formulation and implementation of gender sensitive ICT policies and programs.

WOUGNET is guided by four (4) strategic objectives to ensure  that;

 Gender and rights are integrated and enforced in government ICT policy processes and programs.
 Women and girls have access to relevant information in urban and rural areas through the use of ICTs.
 Communities are empowered to use ICTs and demand for their digital rights.
 WOUGNET being   a strong, vibrant and sustainable centre of Gender and ICT excellence in Africa.

Projects 
WOUGNET's current, present and past projects include:

 Civil Society in Uganda Digital Support Programme (CUSDS) supported by the Women Peace and Humanitarian Fund which responded to COVID-19 emergency in Uganda by strengthening the institutional digital capacity of her 23 member organisations in 2020 to remain resilient during a situation where COVID-19 erected roadblocks and restrictions on movement of staff. 
 Women's Rights Online Media Campaigns in Uganda supported by Association for Progressive Communications (APC) in 2020 under All Women Count Project.
 Enhancing Women's Rights Online through Inclusive and effective response to online gender-based violence in Uganda. supported by Digital Human Rights Lab in 2021.
 Our Voices, Our Futures (OVOF) funded by Association for Progressive Communications (APC) from 2021 to 2025.
 Saving Women's Journalists from Online harassment in Uganda by Improving Legislation on Freedom of Expression in the Digital Spaces and Tackling Online harassment (SWIFT) supported by Urgent Action Funds in 2021.
 Promoting Smart Policy Options in Closing Gender Digital Divide in Uganda, in partnership with CfMA supported by World Wide Web Foundation in 2020–2021.
 Strengthening Uganda's Rights to Freedom of Expression through Policy Advocacy and Media (SURFACE) supported by International Centre for Not-for-Profit Law (ICNL) in 2021.
 Marker-Assisted Breeding of selected Native Chickens in Mozambique and Uganda in partnership with  Eduardo Mondlane Mozambique, Makerere University, Gulu University and International Rural Poultry Centre- Kyeema Foundation (Mozambique) supported by African Union from 2019 to 2022.
 Strengthening use of ICTs and social media for Citizen Engagement and improved Service Delivery supported by SIDA in Eastern and Indigo Trust UK in Northern Uganda.
 Strengthening use of ICTs and Social media for citizen engagement and improved service delivery, funded by Indigo Trust UK.
 Increasing women's decision making and influence in Internet Governance and ICT policy for the realization of women's rights in Africa, implemented with WomensNet in Uganda and South Africa and supported by UN Women Fund for Gender Equality.

Membership 
WOUGNET is a network of women's rights organisation with loose membership. The organisation has grown its membership since its inception. Current WOUGNET members are:

 Warm Hearts Foundation (WHF)
 Katosi Women Development Trust (KWDT)
 Ntulume Village Women Development Association (NVIWODA)
 Uganda Women Entrepreneurs Association (UWEAL)
 Comfort Community Empowerment Network (COCENET)
 Local Sustainable Communities Organizations (LOSCO)
 St Bruno Doll Making Group
 Hope Case Foundation (HCF)
 Kigezi Women in Development (KWID)
 Tusubira Women's Group (TUWOGRO)
 Reach out Wives of Soldiers’ Association (ROWOSA)
 Uganda Muslim Women Vision (UMWV)
 Grassroots Women's Association for Development (GWAD)
 Disabled Women in Development (DIWODE)
 Karma Rural Women's Development Organization (KRUWODO)
 Community action for sustainable livelihood (CASUL)
 Slum Aid Project (SAP)
 Ibanda Women's Guild (IWOGU)
 Gabula Atudde Women Group (GABULA ATUDDE)

See also 

 Association for Progressive Communications
 Global Network Initiative
 Dorothy Okello

References

External links 
WOUGNET
WOUGNET on Unesco's learning communities
https://womenintheworld.org/solutions/entry/women-of-uganda-network-wougnet/
https://www.gfar.net/organizations/women-uganda-network
https://policy-practice.oxfam.org/resources/womens-empowerment-mainstreaming-and-networking-weman-a-case-from-uganda-595710/

Organizations established in 2000
Women's organisations based in Uganda
Organizations for women in science and technology
Information technology organisations based in Uganda
2000 establishments in Uganda
Women's rights in Uganda